Disney PhotoPass is a professional photography service offered at Disney theme parks, water parks, and resorts: initially started on December 4, 2004. Photographers are positioned at locations in the theme parks, dining events at the resorts, and at the Bibbidi Bobbidi Boutique at Disney Springs in Walt Disney World or inside Disneyland Resort.

Implementation
Photographers throughout the parks scan a QR code from a Disney mobile app to link photos to the user's account or to a free card containing a serial number. Although it is possible to get a new card for each photograph, attributing new photos to the same card is an option. Parks and resorts that offer MagicBands give the option to link the photos to users accounts. In addition to photographers stationed in front of attractions such as Cinderella Castle in the Magic Kingdom park, guests can also link photos from various rides at parks by using the serial number displayed alongside the photo. These photos can then be printed or implemented into other purchased Disney products.

Guests can view or purchase PhotoPass pictures at locations in the parks (generally near the park entrance) or online by registering the card's number. This can also be done through Disney's two mobile applications: Disneyland, and My Disneyland Experience. Many parks also contain photo centers in various locations that allow visitors to view their photos. Use of the mobile apps allow users to view and download all photos on their account. Guests can also incorporate Disney themed borders, text and characters into their photos. In some locations, photographers stage photos for later inclusion of effects such as fairy wings, or placement of images of Disney characters such as Simba or Stitch. Many of these effects are only offered periodically and are often taken out of rotation. 

Visitors have the option to purchase products with personal photos implemented into them. One such product is a photo book containing a printed copy of each selected photo that is then bound into a book. Other printable products include phone cases, mugs, shirts, calendars, cards, etc.

Private photography sessions can also be arranged at Walt Disney World Resorts and inside the Disneyland Resort parks.

Production
Disney's Photo Books are produced by Jostens in Topeka, Kansas. Prints and other products are produced by Advanced Digital Photo Solutions, Inc through ezprints.com of the Atlanta suburb of Norcross, Georgia.

Disney Cruise Line
A similar but separate service is offered on the Disney Cruise Line. This service is operated by Image, a company headquartered in the Cayman Islands, which runs similar photographic services on other cruise lines such as Royal Caribbean International, Cunard and Norwegian Cruise Lines. While similar options such as adding Disney themed borders and characters to photos is available, photos taken onboard Disney ships are not available through the Disney PhotoPass website. Cruise Line photos also differ from PhotoPass photos in that a copyright release form is available to guests who wish to duplicate prints they've purchased.

References

PhotoPass
Photography